Mirror Ball is the 21st studio album by Canadian musician Neil Young, and features members of American rock band Pearl Jam. It was released on August 7, 1995, through Reprise Records. The album has been certified gold by the RIAA in the United States.

Recording
The album's recording sessions took place in January 1995 and February 1995 at Bad Animals Studio in Seattle. The album was produced by Brendan O'Brien, who had previously worked on Pearl Jam's 1993 album, Vs., and 1994 album, Vitalogy.

Neil Young joined Pearl Jam in the studio in Seattle in January 1995, eleven days after performing with the band at an abortion-rights benefit in Washington, D.C. The album was recorded in four days' studio time (January 26, January 27, February 7, and February 10). Young took the approach of recording the songs live in the studio. Young brought "Song X", "Act of Love", and five other songs into the studio to record for the first session in January. For the second session in February, he brought in two more songs. Young also wrote two new songs during the February recording sessions, and one song from the January sessions was re-recorded. Young said that all of the songs, with the exception of "Song X" and "Act of Love", were written in the four-day time period in which the album was recorded.

Young said he traveled to Seattle to record the record for a "challenge." He said, "Recording Mirror Ball was like audio vérité, just a snapshot of what's happening. Sometimes I didn't know who was playing. I was just conscious of this big smouldering mass of sound." Young called Pearl Jam drummer Jack Irons "unbelievable." He stated that he "played his ass off on every take at every session," and added, "I can't say enough good things about him." Pearl Jam vocalist Eddie Vedder was not around much for the recording sessions. Vedder explained that he was "in the midst of a pretty intense stalker problem," adding that "leaving the house wasn't the easiest thing to do." Vedder would refer to the issue in the song "Lukin" from Pearl Jam's 1996 album, No Code. Pearl Jam guitarist Stone Gossard said that Mirror Ball "came at a time when we needed it, that Neil thought we were a band that would be good to make a record with. He probably felt sorry for us. He made it all right for us to be who we were. He's not taking his career so seriously that he can't take chances. Suddenly, our band seemed too serious."

Music and lyrics
Mirror Ball captures a loose rock sound. The album has a very raw sound to it, with songs ending in feedback and band members talking at the start and at the end of many songs, including Young remarking at the end of "Downtown": "Well, we know that one. That's funky." Young wrote all of the tracks for the album except for "Peace and Love", which was co-written by Young and Vedder. William Ruhlmann of AllMusic said "Pearl Jam boasts spirited rhythms and dense guitar interplay that Young makes excellent use of in a series of songs built out of simple, melodic riffs."

On the lyrical content of Mirror Ball, Young said, "There's idealism and reality, the two have got to come together yet there are always major problems when they do. Maybe that's the crux of what I'm trying to say in this new album. It's also a commentary of the differences between my peace and love '60s generation and the more cynical '90s generation." "Song X" and "Act of Love" were written about abortion. "Downtown" includes references to Jimi Hendrix and Led Zeppelin. The reference to Led Zeppelin was partly inspired by Young's performance with the band at the 1995 Rock and Roll Hall of Fame induction ceremony.

Release and reception

Mirror Ball reached number five on the Billboard 200 album chart. Mirror Ball has been certified gold by the RIAA.

NME gave Mirror Ball a nine out of ten. In the review, Mirror Ball is called "another fine Neil Young album....the record's sound is...big, woolly, live and booming." Rolling Stone staff writer J.D. Considine gave Mirror Ball four out of five stars, saying, "Though Young is clearly the dominant partner—it's his concept, after all, his songs and his album—it's Pearl Jam who ultimately end up determining the music's shape and feel, providing a level of input and energy that goes well beyond the normal purview of a backing band." Spin gave the album eight out of ten stars. The review said, "Sometimes it's easier to string together some power chords and a few forlorn references to religion, fame and suicide than to actually write songs. And sometimes that's just fine." David Browne of Entertainment Weekly gave the album an A−. Browne said that "the album has a spontaneous, bang-it-out casualness that is, to say the least, extremely rare for a rock veteran." However, Browne criticized the album's lyrics, calling them "mostly jumbled rehashes of standard Young imagery." Time reviewer Christopher John Farley said that "Pearl Jam serves as an extraordinary backup band on the new album." Farley added that the album is "one of the most consistently rewarding works of Young's long rewarding career."

Allmusic staff writer William Ruhlmann gave the album three out of five stars, saying that "Mirror Ball is typically uneven." Critic Robert Christgau said that Young "was born to lumber, and Pearl Jam wasn't." Blender gave the album two out of five stars. The review said that "it could have been better. The fault is less with Pearl Jam, who thrash so awkwardly they make Crazy Horse sound like Steely Dan, than with Young’s unmemorable songs."

"Downtown" and "Peace and Love" had accompanying music videos. "Downtown" was the most successful song from Mirror Ball on the rock charts, reaching number six on the Mainstream Rock charts. "Peace and Love" also charted on the Mainstream Rock charts. At the 1996 Grammy Awards, "Downtown" received a nomination for Best Rock Song and "Peace and Love" received a nomination for Best Male Rock Vocal Performance. Mirror Ball received a nomination for Best Rock Album.

In Australia it peaked at #4 on the ARIA charts on July 9, 1995, making it Young's highest-charting album in Australia.

Packaging
Tying in with the album title, a mirror ball graces the album's cover art. Because of legal complications between their respective record companies, only Young's name appears on the album sleeve, although the members of Pearl Jam are credited individually in the album's liner notes. Pearl Jam's Merkin Ball complements the layout and content of the album packaging for Mirror Ball.

Tour
Following the completion of Mirror Ball, the members of Pearl Jam (minus Vedder) and producer O'Brien (on keyboards) joined Young in August 1995 for an eleven-date tour in Europe to promote the album. When the band toured, fans referred to them as "Neil Jam". Pearl Jam guitarist Mike McCready said, "It was a dream come true. We got to play a bunch of Neil Young songs with Neil Young himself and got to go to Berlin, to Jerusalem, to the Red Sea." This tour proved very successful with Young's manager Elliot Roberts calling it "one of the greatest tours we ever had in our whole lives."

Track listing

Outtakes
The songs "I Got Id" and "Long Road", both written and sung by Vedder, were cut from the album. Both songs were recorded at the tail end of the Mirror Ball sessions. The tracks were later released on Pearl Jam's 1995 Merkin Ball EP.

Personnel
Neil Young – vocals, electric guitar, acoustic guitar, pump organ

Pearl Jam
Jeff Ament – bass guitar
Stone Gossard – electric guitar
Jack Irons – drums
Mike McCready – electric guitar
Eddie Vedder – vocals on "Peace and Love", background vocals

Production
John Aguto, Sam Hofstedt, Chad Munsey – assistant engineering
Nicky Alexander, Girsh – drum technicians
Joel Bernstein – production assistance, typography, and mosaic portrait of Neil Young
Gary Burden – art direction and design
Rhonda Burns – CD label computer graphics
Nick DiDia – additional engineering
Henry Diltz – back cover and inside photo
Brett Eliason – engineering
Emek – logo lettering
Joe Gastwirt – Analog to HDCD transfers, digital editing, digital mastering
John Hausman – production assistance
KPOB – art direction and design assistance
Tim Mulligan – digital editing, digital mastering
John Nowland – Analog to HDCD transfers
Brendan O'Brien – production, mixing, electric guitar, piano, background vocals
Jeff Ousley, Tim "Scully" Quinlan – guitar technicians
"Pflash" Pflaumer – assistance
Sal Trentino – amplifier technician
Ian Geiger - guitar technician
George Webb – bass technician
Keith Wissmar – ambience

Chart positions

Album

Year-end charts

Singles

Certifications and sales

References

External links
Mirror Ball information at neilyoung.com

1995 albums
Albums produced by Brendan O'Brien (record producer)
Neil Young albums
Pearl Jam albums
Reprise Records albums
Collaborative albums
Grunge albums